Mystification may refer to:

Mystification (sociology), seventh element identified by Erving Goffman in dramaturgy
Mystification (Diderot), 1768 novella
"Mystification", also known as "Von Jung", short story about dueling from Tales of the Grotesque and Arabesque by Edgar Allan Poe
Mystification (2005 film) (fr), French film with Lucia Sanchez
Mystification (2010 film) (pl), Polish film with Maciej Stuhr
Mystification (album), 1987 album by Manilla Road

See also 
 Deception